Tenfu Tea Museum, in Zhangzhou, Fujian, China, was constructed in 2000, and finished in 2002. It is the world's largest tea museum with a total area of 13 acres. The museum consists of many displays of past tea cultures, tea processing, tea and tea ware, as well as having live tea arts culture performances.

Presentation facilities
The museum consists of five parts: Main Exhibition Hall, Chinese Tea Art Classroom, Japanese Tea House, Korean Tea House, Calligraphy and Chinese Painting Hall.

See also
 China National Tea Museum
 History of tea in China
 Ping-Lin Tea Museum
 List of food and beverage museums

References

China Travel Guide

External links
Museum website 
Museum website 

Museums established in 2002
Tea museums
Museums in Fujian
Chinese tea
Buildings and structures completed in 2002
Zhangzhou
2002 establishments in China

de:Nationales chinesisches Teemuseum
ru:Китайский национальный музей чая